General Carroll may refer to:

Henry Carroll (general) (1836–1908), U.S. Army brigadier general
Joseph Carroll (DIA) (1910–1991), U.S. Air Force lieutenant general
Paul T. Carroll (1910–1954), U.S. Army brigadier general
Samuel S. Carroll (1832–1893), Union Army brigadier general and brevet major general
William Carroll (Tennessee politician) (1788–1844), Tennessee Militia major general in the War of 1812
William Henry Carroll (1810–1868), Confederate States Army brigadier general